Below is a list of Canadian plants by genus.  Due to the vastness of Canada's biodiversity, this page is divided.

Many of the plants seen in Canada are introduced, either intentionally or accidentally.  N indicated native and X indicated exotic.  Those plants whose status is unknown are marked with a ?.

A | B | C | D | E | F | G | H | I J K | L | M | N | O | P Q | R | S | T | U V W | X Y Z

Ca 

 Cakile — searockets
 Cakile edentula — American searocket
 Calamagrostis — reedgrasses
 Calamagrostis canadensis — Canada bluejoint, Canada reedgrass, Langsdorff's reedgrass, Macoun's reedgrass
 Calamagrostis deschampsioides — circumpolar reedgrass 
 Calamagrostis lapponica — Lapland reedgrass
 Calamagrostis purpurascens — purple reedgrass
 Calamagrostis stricta subsp. inexpansa — bog reedgrass, northern reedgrass
 Calamintha — calamints
 Calamintha arkansana — low calamint, savoury, wild calamint, limestone wild basil
 Calamovilfa — sandreeds
 Calamovilfa longifolia var. magna — prairie sandreed
 Calla — callas
 Calla palustris — wild calla, water arum
 Callitriche — water-starworts
 Callitriche hermaphroditica — narrowleaf water-starwort, northern water-starwort, autumnal water-starwort
 Callitriche heterophylla — larger water-starwort
 Callitriche palustris — vernal water-starwort
 Callitropsis — 
 Callitropsis nootkatensis — Alaska yellow cedar, Nootka false-cypress, yellow cedar
 Calopogon — grass-pinks
 Calopogon tuberosus — tuberous grass-pink
 Caltha — marsh marigolds
 Caltha natans — floating marsh marigold
 Caltha palustris — marsh marigold, cowslip, kingcup, cowflock
 Calypso — calypsoes
 Calypso bulbosa — calypso, fairy-slipper, nymph-of-the-north
 Calystegia — bindweeds
 Calystegia sepium — hedge bindweed, wild morning glory
 Calystegia spithamaea — low bindweed
 Camassia — hyacinths
 Camassia scilloides — wild hyacinth Threatened
 Campanula — bellflowers
 Campanula aparinoides — marsh bellflower, bedstraw bedflower, marsh harebell
 Campanula rotundifolia — American harebell, Scottish bluebell, bluebells of Scotland
 Campanulastrum — bellflowers
 Campanulastrum americanum — tall bellflower, American bellflower
 Campsis — trumpet vines
 Campsis radicans — trumpet vine, trumpet creeper
 Canadanthus — 
 Canadanthus modestus — Canada aster, western bog aster, great northern aster, purple northern aster
 Cardamine — toothworts
 Cardamine bulbosa — spring cress, bulbous cress
 Cardamine concatenata — cutleaf toothwort, five-parted toothwort, slender toothwort
 Cardamine diphylla — twoleaf toothwort, broadleaf toothwort, crinkleroot
 Cardamine douglasii — purple cress, limestone bittercress
 Cardamine parviflora — small-flowered bittercress, sand bittercress
 Cardamine pensylvanica — Pennsylvania bittercress, Quaker bittercress
 Cardamine pratensis var. angustifolia — meadow bittercress
 Cardamine pratensis var. palustris — cuckoo-flower, lady's smock
 Carex spp. see List of Carex species in Canada
 Carpinus — hornbeams
 Carpinus caroliniana — ironwood, American hornbeam, blue beech, musclewood
 Carya — hickories
 Carya cordiformis — bitternut hickory, swamp hickory, pignut hickory, yellowbud hickory
 Carya glabra — pignut hickory, sweet pignut, red hickory
 Carya laciniosa — big shellbark hickory
 Carya ovata — shagbark hickory, upland hickory, shellbark hickory

 Castanea — chestnuts
 Castanea dentata — American chestnut, toothed chestnut Endangered Castilleja — Indian paintbrushes
 Castilleja coccinea — scarlet Indian paintbrush, scarlet painted-cup
 Castilleja raupii — Raup's painted-cup, Raup's Indian paintbrush
 Castilleja septentrionalis — northern paintbrush, Labrador Indian paintbrush
 Catabrosa — brook grasses
 Catabrosa aquatica — brook grass, water hairgrass
 Caulophyllum — cohoshes
 Caulophyllum giganteum
 Caulophyllum thalictroides — blue cohosh

 Ce 

 Ceanothus — New Jersey teas
 Ceanothus americanus — New Jersey tea, redroot, white snowball, mountainsweet
 Ceanothus herbaceus — narrowleaf New Jersey tea, prairie redroot, inland ceanothus
 Celastrus — bittersweets
 Celastrus scandens — climbing bittersweet, American bittersweet
 Celtis — hackberries
 Celtis occidentalis — sugarberry, northern hackberry, false elm, common hackberry
 Celtis tenuifolia — dwarf hackberry Threatened Cenchrus — sandbars
 Cenchrus longispinus — longspine sandbur
 Cephalanthus — buttonbushes
 Cephalanthus occidentalis — common buttonbush
 Cerastium — mouse-ear chickweeds
 Cerastium alpinum — alpine mouse-ear chickweed, alpine chickweed, woolly alpine chickweed
 Cerastium arvense subsp. strictum — field mouse-ear chickweed, meadow mouse-ear chickweed, prairie mouse-ear chickweed (other subspecies, including the type subsp. arvense, are considered introduced)
 Cerastium brachypodum — shortstalk mouse-ear chickweed
 Cerastium nutans — nodding mouse-ear chickweed
 Cerastium velutinum — long-hairy chickweed
 Ceratophyllum — hornworts
 Ceratophyllum demersum — common hornwort, coontail
 Ceratophyllum echinatum — spineless hornwort

 Ch 

 Chaerophyllum — chervils
 Chaerophyllum procumbens var. procumbens — spreading chervil
 Chaerophyllum procumbens var. shortii
 Chamaedaphne — leatherleafs
 Chamaedaphne calyculata — leatherleaf, dwarf cassandra
 Chamaesyce — spurges
 Chamaesyce polygonifolia — seaside spurge, seaside sandmat, sea milk-purslane
 Chamaesyce vermiculata — wormseed spurge, wormseed sandmat, hairy spurge, hairy-stemmed milk-purslane
 Chelone — turtleheads
 Chelone glabra — white turtlehead
 Chenopodium — goosefeet
 Chenopodium bushianum — village goosefoot
 Chenopodium capitatum — strawberry blite, strawberry-spinach, Indian paint, Indian ink, strawberry goosefoot
 Chenopodium foggii — Fogg's goosefoot
 Chenopodium leptophyllum — narrowleaf goosefoot
 Chenopodium pratericola — pale goosefoot, narrowleaf goosefoot, desert goosefoot
 Chenopodium salinum
 Chenopodium simplex — mapleleaf goosefoot, giantseed goosefoot
 Chenopodium standleyanum — Standley's goosefoot
 Chimaphila — pipsissewas
 Chimaphila maculata — striped pipsissewa, striped wintergreen, spotted wintergreen, striped prince's pine Endangered Chimaphila umbellata — pipsissewa, prince's pine
 Chrysanthemum — daisies
 Chrysanthemum arcticum — arctic daisy
 Chrysosplenium — saxifrages
 Chrysosplenium americanum — golden saxifrage, American watermat, American golden saxifrage
 Chrysosplenium tetrandrum — alternate-leaf watermat, northern golden saxifrage, northern golden-carpet

 Ci 

 Cicuta — water hemlocks
 Cicuta bulbifera — bulb-bearing water hemlock
 Cicuta maculata — spotted water hemlock, spotted cowbane, musquash-root, beaver-poison
 Cicuta virosa — MacKenzie's water hemlock, northern water hemlock
 Cimicifuga — cohoshes
 Cimicifuga racemosa — black cohosh, black snakeroot, black bugbane
 Cinna — wood reedgrasses
 Cinna arundinacea — stout wood reedgrass
 Cinna latifolia — slender wood reedgrass, drooping woodreed, broadleaf woodgrass
 Circaea — enchanter's nightshades
 Circaea alpina — dwarf enchanter's nightshade, small enchanter's nightshade
 Circaea lutetiana — Canada enchanter's nightshade, southern broadleaf enchanter's nightshade
 Cirsium — thistles
 Cirsium discolor — pasture thistle, field thistle
 Cirsium drummondii — Drummond's thistle, short-stem thistle, dwarf thistle
 Cirsium flodmanii — prairie thistle, woolly thistle, Flodman's thistle
 Cirsium hillii — Hill's thistle Threatened Cirsium muticum — swamp thistle, dunce nettle, horsetops
 Cirsium pitcheri — Pitcher's thistle, sand dune thistle

 Cl 

 Cladium — twigrushes
 Cladium mariscoides — twigrush, smooth sawgrass
 Claytonia — spring beauties
 Claytonia caroliniana — Carolina spring beauty
 Claytonia virginica — eastern spring beauty, narrowleaf spring beauty, Virginia spring beauty
 Clematis — virgin's-bowers
 Clematis occidentalis — western blue virgin's-bower, purple clematis, rock clematis, purple virgin's-bower
 Clematis virginiana — Virginia virgin's-bower, Devil's darning-needles
 Clinopodium — dog mints
 Clinopodium vulgare — dog mint, wild basil, cushion calamint
 Clintonia — blue-bead lilies
 Clintonia borealis — blue-bead lily, cornlily, poisonberry, yellow clintonia

 Co 

 Coeloglossum — green orchises
 Coeloglossum viride var. viriscens — long-bract green orchis
 Coeloglossum viride var. viride — bracted orchid
 Collinsia — horsebalms
 Collinsia canadensis — Canada horsebalm, northern horsebalm, stoneroot, richweed
 Collinsia parviflora — bluelips, small blue-eyed Mary
 Collomia — glueseeds
 Collomia linearis — glueseed, narrowleaf collomia
 Comandra — comandras
 Comandra umbellata — bastard toadflax, star toadflax
 Comptonia — sweetferns
 Comptonia peregrina — sweetfern
 Conioselinum — hemlock parsleys
 Conioselinum chinense — hemlock parsley
 Conopholis— squawroots
 Conopholis americana — squawroot
 Conyza — fleabanes
 Conyza canadensis — Canada fleabane, horseweed, butterweed
 Coptis — goldthreads
 Coptis trifolia — goldthread, canker-root, yellow snakeroot
 Corallorrhiza — coralroots
 Corallorrhiza maculata — spotted coralroot
 Corallorhiza odontorhiza — autumn coralroot
 Corallorrhiza striata — striped coralroot
 Corallorrhiza trifida — early coralroot, pale coralroot, northern coralroot
 Coreopsis — tickseeds
 Coreopsis lanceolata — lanceleaf tickseed, garden coreopsis, long-stalked coreopsis
 Coreopsis tripteris — tall coreopsis
 Corispermum — bugseeds
 Corispermum americanum — American bugseed
 Corispermum hookeri — Hooker's bugseed
 Corispermum pallasii — Pallas' bugseed
 Corispermum villosum — hairy bugseed
 Cornus — dogwoods
 Cornus alternifolia — alternate-leaf dogwood, pagoda dogwood, green osier
 Cornus amomum subsp. amomum — silky dogwood, red willow, swamp dogwood
 Cornus amomum subsp. obliqua
 Cornus canadensis — Canada bunchberry, crackerberry, dwarf cornel
 Cornus drummondii — roughleaf dogwood, Drummond's dogwood
 Cornus florida — eastern flowering dogwood, common white dogwood
 Cornus foemina — stiff dogwood, English dogwood, stiff cornel
 Cornus rugosa — roundleaf dogwood
 Cornus stolonifera — red-osier dogwood
 Corydalis — corydalises
 Corydalis aurea — golden corydalis
 Corydalis flavula — yellow corydalis
 Corydalis sempervirens — pale corydalis
 Corylus — hazelnuts
 Corylus americana — American hazelnut, American filbert
 Corylus cornuta — beaked hazelnut, beaked filbert

 Cr 

 Crassula — pygmyweeds
 Crassula aquatica — water pygmyweed
 Crataegus — hawthorns
 Crataegus apiomorpha
 Crataegus beata
 Crataegus brainerdii — Brainerd's hawthorn
 Crataegus calpodendron — pear hawthorn
 Crataegus chrysocarpa var. aboriginum
 Crataegus chrysocarpa var. chrysocarpa — fireberry hawthorn, roundleaf hawthorn
 Crataegus chrysocarpa var. phoenicea
 Crataegus coccinea var. coccinea — scarlet hawthorn
 Crataegus coccinea var. fulleriana — Fuller's hawthorn
 Crataegus cognata — white-anthered frosted hawthorn
 Crataegus comptacta
 Crataegus crus-galli — cockspur hawthorn
 Crataegus dilatata — broadleaf hawthorn
 Crataegus dissona
 Crataegus dodgei var. dodgei — Dodge's hawthorn
 Crataegus dodgei var. flavida
 Crataegus douglasii — black hawthorn, Douglas' hawthorn
 Crataegus flabellata — fanleaf hawthorn, Bosc's thorn, New England hawthorn
 Crataegus formosa
 Crataegus irrasa — unshorn thorn, Blanchard's thorn
 Crataegus lumaria
 Crataegus macracantha — longthorn hawthorn, largethorn hawthorn
 Crataegus macrosperma — bigfruit hawthorn, variable thorn
 Crataegus magniflora
 Crataegus margeretta
 Crataegus mollis — downy hawthorn, red haw
 Crataegus pennsylvanica
 Crataegus perjucunda — Middlesex frosted hawthorn
 Crataegus persimilis — plumleaf hawthorn
 Crataegus populnea
 Crataegus pringlei — Pringle's hawthorn
 Crataegus pruinosa var. parvula
 Crataegus pruinosa var. pruinosa — waxy-fruit hawthorn, frosted hawthorn
 Crataegus punctata — dotted hawthorn
 Crataegus rugosa — broadleaf frosted hawthorn
 Crataegus scabrida
 Crataegus schuettei — royal hawthorn
 Crataegus submollis — Québec hawthorn, Emerson's hawthorn
 Crataegus suborbiculata — Caughuawaga hawthorn
 Crataegus succulenta — fleshy hawthorn, longspine hawthorn
 Crataegus tenax
 Cryptogramma — rockbrakes
 Cryptogramma acrostichoides — American rockbrake, parsleyfern, mountain parsley
 Cryptogramma stelleri — Steller's rockbrake, slender cliffbrake, fragile rockbrake
 Cryptotaenia — honeworts
 Cryptotaenia canadensis — Canada honewort

 Cu 

 Cuscuta — dodders
 Cuscuta campestris — field dodder
 Cuscuta cephalanthi — buttonbush dodder
 Cuscuta coryli — hazel dodder
 Cuscuta gronovii — common dodder, scaldweed, swamp dodder, Gronovius dodder

 Cy 

  Cycloloma — pigweeds
 Cycloloma atriplicifolium — winged pigweed
 Cynoglossum — comfreys
 Cynoglossum boreale — northern wild comfrey
 Cyperus — flatsedges
 Cyperus bipartitus — river cyperus, shining flatsedge
 Cyperus dentatus — toothed umbrella-sedge
 Cyperus diandrus — umbrella sedge
 Cyperus erythrorhizos — redroot flatsedge
 Cyperus esculentus — yellow nutgrass, yellow umbrella sedge, chufa flatsedge
 Cyperus flavescens — yellow cyperus
 Cyperus houghtonii — Houghton's flatsedge, Houghton's cyperus
 Cyperus lupulinus subsp. macilentus
 Cyperus odoratus — rusty flatsedge
 Cyperus schweinitzii — Schweinitz' umbrella sedge, Schweinitz' flatsedge
 Cyperus squarrosus — awned cyperus
 Cyperus strigosus — straw-coloured flatsedge
 Cypripedium — lady's-slippers
 Cypripedium acaule — pink lady's-slipper, pink moccasin flower
 Cypripedium arietinum — ram's-head lady's-slipper
 Cypripedium candidum — small white lady's-slipper Endangered Cypripedium parviflorum var. makasin — northern small-flowered yellow lady's-slipper
 Cypripedium parviflorum var. pubescens — large yellow lady's-slipper, yellow moccasin flower, flat-petalled yellow lady's-slipper, golden slipper, whip-poor-will's shoe
 Cypripedium passerinum — sparrow's-egg lady's-slipper, Franklin's lady's-slipper
 Cypripedium reginae — showy lady's-slipper, queen lady's-slipper
 Cystopteris''' — 
 Cystopteris bulbifera — bulblet bladder fern
 Cystopteris fragilis — fragile fern, brittle bladder fern
 Cystopteris laurentiana — Laurentian bladder fern, Laurentian fragile fern
 Cystopteris montana — mountain bladder fern
 Cystopteris protrusa — lowland brittle fern
 Cystopteris tenuis — MacKay's brittle fern

 References See:'' Flora of Canada#References

Canada,genus,C